The Confederation Building is a 10-story office building along the Exchange District of Winnipeg, Manitoba, built by architect J. Wilson Gray. Built in 1913, the building was originally owned and occupied by the Confederation Life Association.

The plaque on the front of the building reads:The Confederation Building

This ten story steel-framed office block is representative of early high-rise building construction technology in Winnipeg. Designed in the Chicago style of architecture by J. Wilson Gray of Toronto, it was erected in 1912 by the Carter-Halls-Aldinger Company of Winnipeg at a cost of $400,000.… Its style, use, and placement within Winnipeg's commercial core make it an enduring symbol of the city's great economic and spatial growth in the early twentieth century

- Historic Sites and Monuments Board of Canada

External links
 Confederation Building, via Emporis

References

Buildings and structures in downtown Winnipeg
National Historic Sites in Manitoba
Municipal Historical Resources of Winnipeg
Office buildings completed in 1913
Chicago school architecture in Canada
1913 establishments in Manitoba